The Eurovision Song Contest 2016 was the 61st edition of the Eurovision Song Contest. Organised by the European Broadcasting Union (EBU) and host broadcaster Sveriges Television (SVT), the contest was held at the Globe Arena and consisted of two semi-finals on 10 and 12 May, and a final on 14 May 2016. The three live shows were presented by Petra Mede and the previous year's winner Måns Zelmerlöw.

Forty-two countries participated in the contest.

This was the first time since the introduction of professional jury voting in  that the overall winner won neither the jury vote, which was won by Australia, nor the televote, which was won by Russia, with Ukraine placing second in both. "1944" is the first song containing lyrics in Crimean Tatar to win the contest.

In the final, Australia's second-place finish was an improvement on its fifth-place finish in 2015, while  finished fourth, its best result since its debut and first participation in a final since 2007.

The contest was the first to implement a voting system change since : each country's professional jury points were announced largely as before, while the results of each national televote were combined and announced in reverse order. It was also the first contest to be broadcast on live television in the United States, and the EBU recorded a record-breaking 204 million viewers worldwide for the contest, beating the 2015 viewing figures by over 5 million.

Location

Venue 
The contest took place in the Globe Arena in Stockholm, following Sweden's victory at the 2015 contest. The Globe Arena has a capacity of approximately 16,000 attendees, and this was the second time the contest has been staged at the venue, after the Eurovision Song Contest 2000.

Bidding phase 
Host broadcaster Sveriges Television (SVT) announced on 24 May, the day after winning the 2015 contest, that the Tele2 Arena in Stockholm was their first choice venue. However, other cities and arenas were invited to apply, and those making a bid had approximately three weeks to submit their offer to SVT.
SVT announced on 1 June the conditions under which cities and venues could announce their interest in hosting the contest:
 SVT had to have access to the venue at least 4–6 weeks before the contest to build the stage and rig up lighting and technology.
 A press centre with a specific size had to be made available at the venue.
 A specific number of hotels and hotel rooms had to be made available in the vicinity of the venue.
 The host city had to be near a major airport.
An announcement regarding the venue was expected from SVT by midsummer, with the Ericsson Globe announced as the venue on 8 July.

Key

 Host venue

Format 
The preliminary dates for the contest were announced on 16 March 2015 at a Heads of Delegation meeting in Vienna, with the semi-finals taking place on 10 and 12 May, and the final on 14 May 2016. These were subject to change depending on SVT, but were later confirmed when Stockholm was announced as the host city.

Discussions were held in 2014 between the EBU and the Asia-Pacific Broadcasting Union (ABU) regarding the inclusion of a guest performance from the ABU TV Song Festival at the contest. The EBU confirmed on 16 July 2015 that they would be looking into the possibility of the proposal, which was discussed at the ABU General Assembly in 2014.

SVT proposed a change of start time of the contest from 21:00 CEST to 20:00 CEST on 9 September, arguing that such a change would help to promote family viewing of the contest, especially in eastern Europe when it would run late into the night. However, the EBU published the public rules of the contest on 28 October, which stated that the start time would remain at 21:00 CEST.

The EBU announced on 23 September that rather than using clips from their respective music videos, extended clips from the dress rehearsals of the six acts who qualified directly to the final (the "Big Five" and host nation Sweden) would be shown as previews during the semi-final in which they were allocated to vote.

The core team for the contest was announced by SVT and the EBU on 26 October. Johan Bernhagen and Martin Österdahl were executive producers, while Tobias Åberg was head of production. The three live shows were directed by Sven Stojanović and the contest was produced by Christer Björkman.

New voting system 

The EBU announced on 18 February 2016 that a new voting system would be implemented at the contest for the first time since 1975. The new system, inspired by the voting system of Melodifestivalen, involved each country awarding two sets of points from 1–8, 10 and 12: one from their professional jury and the other from televoting. Televoting votes from all the countries would be pooled. After viewers cast their votes, the results of each professional jury would be presented, with countries receiving 1–8 and 10 points being displayed on-screen, instead of 1–7 as had been the case since , and the national spokesperson announcing only the country to which they award 12 points. After the results of the professional juries were presented, the televoting points from all participating countries would be combined, providing one score for each song. The new voting system would also be used to determine the qualifiers from each semi-final, but, as before, the qualifiers are announced in a random order.

As the new voting system would give equal weight to jury and televoting results, a national jury result could not be used as a backup result for the televoting or vice versa. Therefore, if a country could not deliver a valid televoting/jury result, a substitute result would be calculated by the jury/televoting result of a pre-selected group of countries approved by the contest's Reference Group. The Director General of Radiotelevisione della Repubblica di San Marino (SMRTV), Carlo Romeo, stated on 23 February that the use of a substitute televoting result discriminated against microstates like San Marino, which only used a professional jury due to their use of the Italian phone system and would therefore have its voting representation diminished under the new system, and criticised the EBU for not contacting its members before making the decision.

Other sites 

The EBU announced on 14 March 2016 that the Tele2 Arena in Stockholm would host a live event running alongside the final of the contest on 14 May. Eurovision The Party, hosted by Sanna Nielsen, allowed fans to watch the final on a big screen and featured backstage material from the Globe Arena such as Nielsen conducting exclusive interviews and appearing with hosts Petra Mede and Måns Zelmerlöw. The results of the Swedish jury vote was also announced live from the event by Gina Dirawi. A pre-party and after-party was also held and featured performances from former contest winners Carola and Loreen as well as Danny Saucedo, Panetoz and DJ Tim Henri. Executive producer Johan Bernhagen has stated that the event complements existing events being held at the Eurovision Village and the EuroClub, and it is hoped that Eurovision The Party would become an annual event in the host city of the contest.

Presenters 

After his victory in the 2015 contest, Måns Zelmerlöw announced his interest in hosting the 2016 contest. His experience as a television presenter includes Melodifestivalen 2010 and SVT sing-along show Allsång på Skansen. Christer Björkman told Expressen on 25 May that Gina Dirawi, Petra Mede and Sanna Nielsen were also being considered as hosts, but it was reported on 1 June that SVT was considering Zelmerlöw and Dolph Lundgren as co-hosts. Expressen reported on 19 August that Mede and Zelmerlöw were SVT's first choice of hosts, while it was announced at a press conference on 14 December that they would indeed co-host.

The press conferences were presented by Jovan Radomir and Catarina Rolfsdotter-Jansson, who also provided commentary from the red carpet event in front of the Stockholm Palace, before the official welcome party at Stockholm City Hall on 8 May 2016.

Semi-final allocation draw 
The draw to determine the allocation of the participating countries into their respective semi-finals took place at Stockholm City Hall on 25 January 2016, hosted by Alexandra Pascalidou and Jovan Radomir. The first part of the draw determined in which semi-final the "Big Five" and host country Sweden would have to vote. The second part of the draw decided in which half of the respective semi-finals each country would perform, with the exact running order determined by the producers of the show at a later date. The EBU originally announced that the running order would be revealed on 5 April, however for undisclosed reasons this was later put back to 8 April. From each semi-final, ten countries joined the "Big Five" and Sweden in the final, where a total of twenty-six countries participated.

The thirty-seven semi-finalists were allocated into six pots, which were published by the EBU on 21 January, based on historical voting patterns as calculated by the contest's official televoting partner Digame.

Opening and interval acts 

The EBU announced on 1 May 2016 that the opening act of the first semi-final would be a performance of "Heroes" by Måns Zelmerlöw, while the opening act of the second semi-final would be a musical theatre comedy song entitled "That's Eurovision", composed by Matheson Bayley and written by Bayley, Edward af Sillén and Daniel Réhn, and performed by Zelmerlöw and Mede. The opening act of the final was a parade of flags similar to final opening ceremonies since 2013, themed as a tribute to Swedish fashion design and dance music with artists being welcomed on stage in a catwalk fashion show with flags being projected onto 26 dresses designed by Bea Szenfeld.

The interval acts of both semi-finals were sketches choreographed by Fredrik Rydman: "The Grey People" in the first semi-final and "Man vs Machine" in the second semi-final respectively. The EBU announced on 9 May that one of the interval acts of the final would be a world premiere live performance of "Can't Stop the Feeling!" and "Rock Your Body" by Justin Timberlake. He was the first "global megastar" in the contest's 61-year-history to perform during the interval.

During the live broadcast of the final on Logo TV in the United States, Timberlake's performance was replaced by a reprise of "The Grey People" from the first semi-final, while the official DVD release removed it entirely. In an interview with The Guardian, the contest's Executive Supervisor, Jon Ola Sand, revealed that this was due to rights restrictions.

Participating countries 

Participating countries had until 15 September 2015 to submit their applications for participation in the contest, and until 10 October to withdraw their applications without facing financial sanctions. However,  were disqualified from participation on 22 April 2016, subsequently reducing the number of participating countries to 42.

Four countries returned after absences from recent contests:  since ,  and  since  and  since .  also returned after debuting as a special guest in 2015, but by invitation of the EBU due to the associate membership status of the Special Broadcasting Service. However, instead of pre-qualifying for the final and voting in all three live shows, as was the case in 2015, Australia entered the second semi-final and voted only in that semi-final and the final.  did not enter, largely due to their national broadcaster's insufficient promotion of their music-based media, as well as a poorly structured selection process, while Romania were disqualified from participation on 22 April 2016 due to repeated non-payment of debts by their national broadcaster to the EBU.

Returning artists 
Seven artists returned after having previously participated in the contest. 

Armenian backing vocalist Monica previously represented Armenia in Junior Eurovision Song Contest 2008.

Sahlene, who represented Estonia in Eurovision Song Contest 2002, returned as a backing vocalist for Australia.

Martina Majerle, who represented Slovenia in 2009 and provided backing vocals numerous times for Croatia 2003, Montenegro 2008, 2014 and Slovenia 2007, 2011, 2012, returned as a backing vocalist for Croatia.

Semi-final 1 
Eighteen countries participated in the first semi-final. The highlighted countries qualified for the final.

Semi-final 2 
Eighteen countries participated in the second semi-final. The highlighted countries qualified for the final.

Final 
26 countries participated in the final, with all 42 participating countries eligible to vote. The running order for the final was revealed after the second semi-final qualifiers' press conference on 13 May.

Detailed voting results

Semi-final 1

12 points 
Below is a summary of the maximum 12 points awarded by each country's professional jury and televote in the first semi-final. Countries in bold gave the maximum 24 points (12 points apiece from professional jury and televoting) to the specified entrant.

Semi-final 2

12 points 
Below is a summary of the maximum 12 points awarded by each country's professional jury and televote in the second semi-final. Countries in bold gave the maximum 24 points (12 points apiece from professional jury and televoting) to the specified entrant.

Final

12 points 
Below is a summary of the maximum 12 points awarded by each country's professional jury and televote in the final. Countries in bold gave the maximum 24 points (12 points apiece from professional jury and televoting) to the specified entrant.

Spokespersons 
The spokespersons announced the 12-point score from their respective country's national jury in the following order:

 Kati Bellowitsch
 Unnsteinn Manúel Stefánsson
 Tural Asadov
 
 
 Sinéad Kennedy
 Nina Sublatti
 Ivana Crnogorac
 Ben Camille
 
 
 Sebalter
 Ulla Essendrop
 Élodie Gossuin
 Olivia Furtună
 Arman Margaryan
 Loukas Hamatsos
 Anna Angelova
 Trijntje Oosterhuis
 
 
 Uzari
 Barbara Schöneberger
 Nyusha
 Elisabeth Andreassen
 Lee Lin Chin
 
 Richard Osman
 Nevena Rendeli
 Constantinos Christoforou
 Ugnė Galadauskaitė
 
 Dijana Gogova
 Andri Xhahu
 
 Verka Serduchka
 Claudia Andreatti
 
 Marjetka Vovk
 Csilla Tatár
 Danijel Alibabić
 Gina Dirawi

Other countries 

Eligibility for potential participation in the Eurovision Song Contest requires a national broadcaster with active EBU membership that would be able to broadcast the contest via the Eurovision network. The EBU issued an invitation to participate in the contest to all active members and associate member Australia.

Active EBU members 
 – Ràdio i Televisió d'Andorra (RTVA) announced on 2 September 2015 that Andorra would not participate in the contest.
 – Télé Liban (TL) had not ruled out participation as of 15 October 2015, stating in an email: "We are not sure yet, however we are working on it and will keep you updated". However, Lebanon was not on the final list of participating countries announced by the EBU on 26 November.
 – RTL Télé Lëtzebuerg (RTL) announced on 4 September 2015 that Luxembourg would not participate in the contest, due to the financial and organisational strain of a potential participation on the channel, especially with a small financial budget.
 – Télé Monte Carlo (TMC) announced on 21 July 2015 that Monaco would not participate in the contest.
 – Rádio e Televisão de Portugal (RTP) had encouraged viewers to suggest changes to their selection process, assuming they had chosen to participate in the contest. Portugal has failed to qualify for the final since , which the majority of the Portuguese public believe is because of RTP's current selection format, Festival da Canção. Kátia Aveiro, sister of Cristiano Ronaldo, had launched a campaign on Twitter asking fans to back her bid to represent Portugal. However, RTP announced on 7 October 2015 that Portugal would not participate in the 2016 contest, adding that they were looking forward to participating in the 2017 contest with a restructured selection process. RTP's ombudsman, Jaime Fernandes, stated on 7 November during the television show A Voz do Cidadão that the decision was due not only to poor results in previous contests, but also RTP's rather insufficient promotion of music-related content.
 – Romania had originally confirmed their participation in the contest with the song "Moment of Silence", performed by Ovidiu Anton. However, the EBU announced on 22 April 2016 that Televiziunea Română (TVR) had repeatedly failed to pay debts totalling CHF 16 million (€14.56 million) by 20 April, the deadline set by the EBU. TVR's failure to repay their debts resulted in their expulsion from the EBU, and consequently Romania's disqualification from the contest. This has led to strong reactions against the decision.
 – Rozhlas a televízia Slovenska (RTVS) returned to the Eurovision Young Dancers in 2015, with RTVS explaining that the return of Slovakia to EYD supported domestic production and promoted national culture at a European level. RTVS announced on 28 September 2015 that Slovakia would not participate in the contest. RTVS' PR manager, Juraj Kadáš, explained on 12 April 2016 that Slovakia's absence from the contest since 2012 was not due to poor results, but rather the cost associated with participation.
 – The EBU announced on 2 October 2015 that despite speculation surrounding their participation, Türkiye Radyo ve Televizyon Kurumu (TRT) had yet to make a final decision. However, TRT announced on 3 November that Turkey would not participate in the contest, adding their discontent at the introduction of a mixed voting system to the contest and the pre-qualification of the Big Five for the final. It was later revealed that singer Atiye would have gone to Eurovision 2016.

Associate EBU members 
 – The EBU announced on 18 December 2015 that Khabar Agency would have associate EBU membership from 1 January 2016. However, Kazakhstan would be unable to debut at the contest as eligibility for participation requires a national broadcaster with active EBU membership.

Non-EBU members 
 – Hunan Television announced its interest in participating in the contest on 22 May 2015, with the EBU responding, saying that "we are open and are always looking for new elements in each Eurovision Song Contest". However, on 3 June, the EBU denied that China would debut at the contest as a guest or full participant.
 – Faroese publication Portal reported on 9 June 2015 that Kringvarp Føroya (KVF) had applied for active EBU membership, a requisite for participation in the contest. However, it was rejected due to the islands' membership of the Danish Realm. Faroese Education Minister Bjørn Kalsø supported participation, saying "the justification so far has been that the countries have to be acknowledged by the United Nations as independent in order to participate. But there is no doubt that we could easily overstep those barriers, if we’re absolutely determined to reach this goal … it is completely up to Kringvarpið … to renew the application regularly, and show the EBU that the Faroe Islands are an equal match to other countries when it comes to participation in the Eurovision Song Contest."
 – Kosovan Deputy Minister of Foreign Affairs Petrit Selimi tweeted on 23 May 2015 that Kosovo, which is not recognised by 15 states in Europe and does not have a national broadcaster with active EBU membership, would debut at the contest. Selimi tweeted that he knew that Kosovo would participate, but did not elaborate on how it would come about. However, on 3 June, the EBU denied that Kosovo would debut at the contest, as Radio Televizioni i Kosovës (RTK) has neither active nor associate EBU membership.
 – 1 Fürstentum Liechtenstein Television (1FLTV) announced on 16 September 2015 that Liechtenstein would be unable to debut at the contest due to insufficient funding for EBU membership.

Broadcasts 

Most countries sent commentators to Stockholm or commentated from their own country, in order to add insight to the participants and, if necessary, the provision of voting information.

It was reported by the EBU that the contest was viewed by a worldwide television audience of over 200 million viewers, beating the 2015 record which was viewed by 197 million.

International sign broadcast 
SVT announced on 22 April 2016 that they would offer International Sign broadcasts of all three live shows for the hearing impaired. All three broadcasts were produced by Julia Kankkonen. The performances of competing entries were interpreted by ten sign language performers and the dialogue of hosts were interpreted by three sign language performers:

 Markus Aro (Finland)
 Ebru Bilen Basaran (Denmark)
 Vivien Batory (Denmark)
 Laith Fathulla (Sweden)
 Rafael-Evitan Grombelka (Germany)
 Amadeus Lantz (Sweden)
 Georg Marsh (Austria)
 Amina Ouahid (Sweden)
 Tommy Rangsjö (Sweden)
 Pavel Rodionov (Russia)
 Laura Levita Valytė (Lithuania)
 Kolbrún Völkudóttir (Iceland)
 Xuejia Rennie Zacsko (Sweden)

The international sign broadcasts was streamed online alongside the three live shows, with the following countries also televising the broadcasts:

  – ORF 2 (final)
  – DR Ramasjang (all shows)
  – LRT Kultūra (all shows)
  – NRK Tegnspråk (all shows)
  – SVT24 (all shows)

Incidents

Disqualification of Romania 
Romania's participation was reported to be in danger on 19 April 2016 due to repeated non-payment of debts by Televiziunea Română (TVR) to the EBU, totalling CHF 16 million (€14.56 million) dating back to January 2007. The EBU had requested the Romanian government to repay the debt before 20 April or face exclusion from the contest. The EBU announced on 22 April that after the Romanian government had failed to repay the debt by the deadline, TVR were expelled from the EBU, consequently disqualifying Romania from the contest. The Director General of the EBU, Ingrid Deltenre, said that while "it is regrettable that we are forced to take this action […] The continued indebtedness of TVR jeopardizes the financial stability of the EBU itself".

However, because the official album of the contest had been produced before the disqualification, the planned Romanian entry, "Moment of Silence", performed by Ovidiu Anton, would remain on both digital and physical copies of the album. The song had been written following the Colectiv nightclub fire in October 2015.

German artist replacement 
Norddeutscher Rundfunk (NDR) announced on 19 November 2015 that Xavier Naidoo would represent Germany in the contest. However, his selection was criticised due to his history of expressing far-right political views in his actions and lyrics, including a speech made at a protest in 2014 supporting the assertion that the German Reich continues to exist within its pre-World War II borders, his propagation of conspiracy theories surrounding the September 11 attacks and the 2008 financial crisis, and a song in which he referred to Baron Rothschild as "Baron Deadschild" and a "schmuck", as well as a collaboration with Kool Savas titled "Wo sind sie jetzt?", which contained homophobic lyrics which were interpreted as associating homosexuality with paedophilia. Critics of his selection included Johannes Kahrs, who branded the decision "unspeakable and embarrassing", the Amadeu Antonio Foundation and Bild.

In light of the negative response and the need to quickly decide a new selection process, NDR withdrew its proposal to send Naidoo on 21 November. ARD co-ordinator Thomas Schreiber stated that "Xavier Naidoo is a brilliant singer who is, according to my own opinion, neither racist nor homophobe. It was clear that his nomination would polarise opinions, but we were surprised about the negative response. The Eurovision Song Contest is a fun event, in which music and the understanding between European people should be the focus. This characteristic must be kept at all costs."

Russian jury votes 
The EBU announced on 10 May 2016 that they were investigating reports of possible rule violations after Russian jury member Anastasia Stotskaya streamed footage of the Russian jury deliberation during the dress rehearsal of the first semi-final on 9 May on the live-streaming social media site Periscope. The video showed one jury member not paying attention to the Dutch performance, while another jury member was filmed during the Armenian performance stating that she will support Armenia "because [her] husband is Armenian". The video also shows jury members on their phones during other performances, as well as a glimpse of Stotskaya's voting result, which also included notes evaluating performances. The rules of the contest stipulate that all jury members are to evaluate performances individually, without discussing the results with other jury members, a stipulation that was clearly violated by the Russian jury.

The EBU released a statement later on 10 May, stating that following talks with Russia-1, the broadcaster proposed to withdraw Stotskaya, declaring her voting results to be invalid, and provide a replacement judge for the final on 14 May. The statement also clarified that the other four jury members submitted a valid jury vote. The EBU also stated that while streaming a video online from the jury deliberation is not considered to be a breach of the rules of the contest, so long as individual rankings, combined rankings or jury points are kept confidential until after the final, it regards Stotskaya's actions "as not in keeping with the spirit of the contest and potentially prejudicial as it imposes a potential risk of accidentally revealing results".

Protests over official flag policy 
In ensuring the apolitical nature of the contest and the safety of attendees, the EBU released an official flag policy on 29 April 2016, which included a list of flags which would be banned from the three live shows. The President of the Basque Country, Iñigo Urkullu, and the Spanish Minister for Foreign Affairs and Cooperation, José Manuel García-Margallo, protested at the specific inclusion of the flag of the Basque Country alongside other flags such as those of some unrecognised nations and the Islamic State, and called on the organisers of the contest to rectify the issue. Radiotelevisión Española (RTVE) also expressed their concern to the EBU and requested a rectification, with the EBU responding, saying that while the flag of the Basque Country is not specifically forbidden, it is an example of a banned flag, adding that only the "official national flags of the 42 participating countries, or from one of the countries that have recently taken part", "official national flags of any of the other United Nations member states", the flag of Europe and the rainbow flag were permitted.

The EBU issued a statement later on 29 April, clarifying that it was not their intention to publish such a document, while acknowledging that the decision to publish a selection of flags of organisations and territories, each of which were "of a very different nature", was an insensitive one, and apologised for any offence caused by the publication of the original flag policy. The EBU also called on both the Avicii Arena and the contest's official ticketing partner AXS to publish an updated flag policy which did not include examples of banned flags.

The EBU released another statement on 6 May, stating that after discussing the matter with several participating delegations, the organisers of the contest had "agreed to relax the flag policy, and to allow national, regional and local flags of the participants" such as the Welsh flag (as Joe Woolford, representing the United Kingdom as part of Joe and Jake, is Welsh) and the Sami flag (as Agnete, representing Norway, is of Sami heritage), as well as the flags of all UN member states, the flag of the EU and the rainbow flag, as stated in the original flag policy. The EBU also proposed a more tolerant approach to other flags as long as attendees respect the apolitical nature of the contest and do not attempt to deliberately obstruct the camera views. Such a proposal was approved by the contest's Reference Group.

The Spanish Embassy in Stockholm filed a formal complaint to Swedish police on 15 May after a Spanish citizen carrying the flag of the Basque Country had his flag confiscated by security personnel and was asked along with two of his compatriots to leave the venue. After an urgent intervention by the Spanish Consul, who was present in the arena, the flag was returned to the attendees and they were permitted to return to the venue.

Nagorno-Karabakh flag dispute 

Despite the official flag policy published by the EBU allowing only "national, regional and local flags of the participants" and banning the flag of the Nagorno-Karabakh Republic, during the first voting recap of the first semi-final on 10 May, the Armenian representative Iveta Mukuchyan was filmed in the green room holding the flag of the Nagorno-Karabakh Republic, sparking condemnation from the Azerbaijani press. The situation further escalated during the semi-final qualifiers' press conference afterwards, where a member of the Azerbaijani press criticised the Armenian delegation and the EBU for allowing the flag to be shown during the show. Responding to a question on the incident from a journalist from Aftonbladet, Mukuchyan stated: "My thoughts are with my Motherland. I want peace everywhere." Commenting on the situation, the Azerbaijani representative Samra stated that "Eurovision is a song contest and it's all about music."

The EBU and the contest's Reference Group released a joint statement on 11 May, strongly condemning Mukuchyan's actions during the first voting recap of the first semi-final and considering it "harmful" to the overall image of the contest. The Reference Group consequently sanctioned Public Television of Armenia (AMPTV), citing a breach of the rule stating that "no messages promoting any organisation, institution, political cause or other causes shall be allowed in the shows". Furthermore, the Reference Group has pointed out that a further breach of the rules of the contest could lead to disqualification from the contest or future contests. The spokesman for the Azerbaijani Ministry of Foreign Affairs, Hikmet Hajiyev, called Mukuchyan's actions "provocative" and unacceptable, claiming that "the Armenian side deliberately resorts to such steps to encourage and promote the illegal formation created in the occupied Azerbaijani territories".

Danish jury result 
BT revealed on 15 May 2016 that Danish professional jury member Hilda Heick, wife of Keld Heick who co-wrote eight Danish entries, had submitted her ranking for the final and the semifinal 2 the wrong way round, ranking her favourite entry 26th while ranking her least-favourite entry first, in direct opposition to what she had intended to do. As a result of Heick's mistake, the points of the Danish jury would have been different:
 Instead of 10 points, Australia would have received 12;
 Instead of 7 points, the Netherlands would have received 10;
 Instead of 5 points, Lithuania would have received 1;
 Instead of 4 points, Sweden would have received 7;
 Instead of 2 points, Israel would have received 4;
 Instead of 1 point, Spain would have received 5;
 Instead of not receiving points at all, France and Russia would have received 2 and 3 points respectively.
The United Kingdom and Ukraine both would have failed to receive any points from the Danish jury. While the overall result was not affected, the margin between second-placed Australia and first-placed Ukraine would have been reduced from 23 points to 9 points.

Protests against the winner 

The Ukrainian winning song, "1944" by Jamala, is about the deportation of the Crimean Tatars in 1944 and particularly about the singer's great-grandmother, who lost her daughter while being deported to Central Asia. Jamala's song was considered by Russian media and lawmakers to be critical of the Russian annexation of Crimea in 2014 and the war in Donbas.

A petition was started on Change.org on 15 May 2016, which called on the EBU to void the final results in view of the fact that the overall winner only placed second in both the jury and televote. The EBU responded that Ukraine "is, and will remain, the winner" of the contest, and that the result was "valid in accordance with the rules".

Later on, a video surfaced depicting Jamala performing "1944" four months before the eligibility date for commercial releases. However, the EBU concluded that "the song was eligible to compete", citing past relaxations of the rule.

Other awards 
In addition to the main winner's trophy, the Marcel Bezençon Awards and the Barbara Dex Award were contested during the 2016 Eurovision Song Contest. The OGAE, "General Organisation of Eurovision Fans" voting poll also took place before the contest.

Marcel Bezençon Awards 
The Marcel Bezençon Awards, organised since 2002 by Sweden's then-Head of Delegation and 1992 representative Christer Björkman, and 1984 winner Richard Herrey, honours songs in the contest's final. The awards were divided into three categories: Artistic Award, Composers Award, and Press Award. The winners were revealed shortly before the final on 14 May.

OGAE 
OGAE, an organisation of over forty Eurovision Song Contest fan clubs across Europe and beyond, conducts an annual voting poll first held in 2002 as the Marcel Bezençon Fan Award. The 2016 poll ran from 4 April to 2 May with votes from 45 clubs while Bulgaria and Moldova's ones abstained, and after all votes were cast, the top-ranked entry was France's "J'ai cherché" performed by Amir; the top five results are shown below.

Barbara Dex Award 
The Barbara Dex Award is a humorous fan award given to the worst dressed artist each year. Named after Belgium's representative who came last in the 1993 contest, wearing her self-designed dress, the award was handed since 1997. After 20 editions, this was the final poll organised by the fansite House of Eurovision, as they handed the reins to the fansite Songfestival.be shortly after the 2016 contest.

Official album 

Eurovision Song Contest: Stockholm 2016 is the official compilation album of the contest, put together by the European Broadcasting Union and was released by Universal Music Group digitally on 15 April and physically on 22 April 2016. The album features all 42 participating entries including the semi-finalists that fail to qualify for the final, as well as the disqualified Romanian entry.

Charts

See also 

ABU Radio Song Festival 2016
Eurovision Young Musicians 2016
Junior Eurovision Song Contest 2016
Türkvizyon Song Contest 2016

Notes and references

Notes

References

External links 

 
2016
Music festivals in Sweden
2016 in Swedish music
2016 song contests
2010s in Stockholm
May 2016 events in Europe
Music in Stockholm